State Road 129 (SR 129) is a part of the Indiana State Road that runs between Vevay and Batesville in the US state of Indiana.  The  of SR 129 that lie within Indiana serve as a minor highway. Some of the highway is listed on the National Highway System. Various sections are urban two-lane highway and rural two-lane highway.  The highway passes through residential and commercial properties.

Route description
SR 129 begins at SR 56 on the banks of the Ohio River on the west side of Vevay. The route heads northwest as a two-lane rural highway, passing through farmland and woodland. The route has an intersection with SR 250, in rural Switzerland County. The highway crosses into Ripley County and begins a concurrency with SR 62. The concurrency heads north-northeast passing through Cross Plains. North of Cross Plains, SR 62 turns east and SR 129 keeps heading north-northwest. The road enters Versailles from the southeast and begins a concurrency with U.S. Route 421 (US 421). The two routes head north towards downtown Versailles and US 50. At US 50, the concurrency with US 421 ends when it heads east concurrent with US 50. SR 129 heads east concurrent with US 50 and leaves town, entering Versailles State Park.  After passing through Versailles State Park, the concurrency endS when SR 129 turns north towards Batesville. The highway enters Batesville and ends at an intersection with SR 46.

The only segment of State Road 129 in Indiana that is included in the National Highway System (NHS), is that concurrent with US 50.  The NHS is a network of highways that are identified as being most important for the economy, mobility and defense of the nation.  The highway is maintained by the Indiana Department of Transportation (INDOT) like all other state roads in the state. The department tracks the traffic volumes along all state roads as a part of its maintenance responsibilities using a metric called average annual daily traffic (AADT). This measurement is a calculation of the traffic level along a segment of roadway for any average day of the year. In 2010, INDOT figured that lowest traffic levels were 1,290 vehicles and 270 commercial vehicles used the highway daily near the intersection with SR 250. The peak traffic volumes were 10,190 vehicles and 610 commercial vehicles AADT along the section of SR 129 at is concurrent with US 421.

History
In 1930 the Indiana State Highway Commission authorized a state road from SR 56 near Vevay to Versailles. This state road was designated as SR 129 in 1931. Paving of the original section was completed between 1965 and 1967. Around 1977 the SR 129 designation was extended north from Versailles to SR 48. The route was extended north again from SR 48 to SR 46 in Batesville between 1990 and 1991.

Major intersections

See also
State Road 29
State Road 229
State Road 329

References

External links

129
Transportation in Ripley County, Indiana
Transportation in Switzerland County, Indiana